John B. Guthrie (July 28, 1807 – August 17, 1885), a Democrat, was twice elected Mayor of Pittsburgh and served from 1851 to 1853.

Biography
John Brandon Guthrie was born in Kittanning, Pennsylvania, the son of shipbuilder James V. Guthrie and Martha Brandon, daughter of Revolutionary War captain John Brandon. When Guthrie was young, his family moved from Armstrong County to Pittsburgh.

Guthrie married Catherine Murray, daughter of Magnus Miller Murray, the lawyer, businessman, and two-time mayor of Pittsburgh. Guthrie served in the Mexican War with the Duquesne Grays. He was appointed "Collector of Customs" for the port of Pittsburgh.

Guthrie served two terms as mayor. During his terms, Guthrie appointed a new police force who ended the lawlessness of 1851 in Pittsburgh. Guthrie was the father of George W. Guthrie, who would also serve as mayor.

Guthrie was a member of the Pennsylvania Constitutional Convention of 1872–73.

He died in 1885 in Cresson, Pennsylvania. He is buried in Allegheny Cemetery.

See also

 List of Mayors of Pittsburgh

References

 Political Graveyard

1807 births
1885 deaths
Mayors of Pittsburgh
American military personnel of the Mexican–American War
Pennsylvania Democrats
Burials at Allegheny Cemetery
19th-century American politicians